Stephen Michael Schwartz (born 1958) is an American career diplomat. He served as the United States Ambassador to Somalia from July 2016 to October 2017.

Early life
Stephen Schwartz was born in Buffalo, New York.

Schwartz was educated at the Williamsville South High School in Williamsville, New York. He graduated from Miami University with a bachelor of science degree in 1980 and is a member of the Sigma Chi Fraternity who honored him as a Significant Sig in 2018. He earned a master of arts degree from SOAS, University of London in 1988, and a master of science degree from the National Defense University's National War College in 2008. He served as a Peace Corps volunteer in Cameroon and Washington, D.C.

Career

Upon joining the United States Foreign Service, Schwartz served in Addis Ababa, Ethiopia; Bujumbura, Burundi; and Nairobi, Kenya. He subsequently served in Havana, Cuba; Pretoria, South Africa; and Port Louis, Mauritius, followed by the Office of Australia, New Zealand and the Pacific Islands; and Lusaka, Zambia. He served as chargé d'affaires to Comoros, Mauritius and the Seychelles from June 2005 until October 2006. He served as Director of the Office of West African Affairs, Bureau of African Affairs, from 2013 to 2015.

Schwartz served as the United States Ambassador to Somalia from July 2016 to October 2017. He resigned on October 6, 2017.

References

External links

1958 births
Living people
Miami University alumni
Alumni of SOAS University of London
National War College alumni
People from Buffalo, New York
Peace Corps volunteers
Ambassadors of the United States to Somalia
United States Foreign Service personnel
21st-century American diplomats